The European Forest Institute (EFI) is an international organization established by the European states.
It has 30 Member Countries, and c. 130 member organizations from 40 different countries working in diverse research fields. EFI provides forest-related knowledge around three interconnected and interdisciplinary themes: bioeconomy, resilience and governance.

Organization

Places and staff 
EFI' s headquarters is located in Joensuu, Finland, and also has offices in Barcelona, Bonn and Brussels as well as an Asia Regional Office in Malaysia. It employs a staff of over 100 experts.

Country members 
The Convention on the European Forest Institute has been ratified by total of 30 European countries by the spring of 2022, namely Austria, Belgium, Bulgaria, Croatia, Czech Republic, Denmark, Estonia, Finland, France, Germany, Greece, Ireland, Italy, Latvia, Lithuania, Luxembourg, Netherlands, Norway, Poland, Portugal, Romania, Serbia, Slovak Republic, Slovenia, Spain, Sweden, Switzerland, Turkey, Ukraine and the United Kingdom. These countries each have a seat in the highest decision-making body in EFI's organisation, the council.

Associate and Affiliate members 
EFI currently has approximately 130 member organisations from more than 40 countries. The benefits of associate and affiliate membership include voting rights for important decisions, access to the EFI network, news and announcements related to European forest research, visibility on the EFI website, and opportunity to receive EFI publications and publish announcements in various EFI channels.

Activities 
EFI conducts research and provides policy support on forest related issues. Further, it facilitate and stimulates forest related networking as well as promotes the supply of unbiased and policy relevant information on forests and forestry. It also advocates for forest research and for scientifically sound information as a basis for policy-making on forests. 
 
EFI excels in carrying out projects at the European level, and has a track record of over 30 projects carried out for the European Commission DGs during the past few years. EFI puts increasing emphasis on cross-sectoral approaches in its research and development activities. It is thus in a good position to have efficient access to social, economic and environmental expertise covering all of Europe's bio-geographical regions. The work in the field of policy support includes enhanced support for decision takers and policy makers. For example, the high-level forum on forests, ThinkForest, brings together high-level policy makers and leading European forest scientists to generate science-policy dialogue on strategic forest-related issues. EFI is quickly becoming a leading science-policy platform providing forest-related knowledge to build a sustainable future: connecting knowledge to action.

EFI has also several facilities, which build on the research knowledge and address particular policies, topics and activities through capacity building, networking and the provision of demand-based expertise.

External links 
 Official EFI webpage

References 

Forest research institutes
Research institutes in Finland
International research institutes
Science and technology in Europe
Forestry in Europe
Forest governance
Forestry agencies
Forest Institute
Intergovernmental environmental organizations
Organizations established in 1993
Intergovernmental organizations established by treaty